Jerónimo de Ayanz y Beaumont (1553 – 23 March 1613 AD) was a Spanish soldier, painter, astronomer, musician and inventor. He pioneered the use and design of the steam engine, as well as mining ventilation systems, improved scientific instrumentation, developed windmills and new types of furnaces for metallurgical, industrial, military, and even domestic operations. He invented a diving bell, patented an immersion suit tested before the court of Felipe III in Pisuerga, on August 2, 1602, and even went so far as to design a submarine. Perhaps his most outstanding work was the steam engine, since he registered the first patent for a modern steam engine in 1606.

Biography 
He was born in Guendulain (Cizur) (Navarre).

Son of Carlos de Ayanz, captain of the Pamplona garrison, and Catalina de Beaumont, he was the second of the male siblings, the eldest being Don Francés de Ayanz, born a year earlier. His mother, Doña Catalina de Beaumont y Navarra, instilled in her children the principles of an education appropriate to her rank. He spent his childhood in the Guenduláin manor until in 1567 he went to serve King Felipe II as a page. At Court he was instructed in military skills, letters and the arts, and also in the management of weapons. mathematics that, later, would serve him for his studies of cosmography.

Military carrer 
His father, Carlos de Ayanz, took part in the campaigns in France, participating in the battle of St. Quentin in 1557 and in the punitive expedition to the then pirate port of San Juan de Luz. Following his example, Jerónimo He followed the arms race after his training in El Escorial. In 1571 he undertook his military career. In 1573 he participated in the campaigns in Tunisia, under the orders of John of Austria. Failing the defense of La Goleta, in 1574 he is assigned to Lombardy, where he served under the command of Alexander Farnese for a few years in which he observed the progress of a city like Milan.

He made the Spanish Road, from Milan to Namur, together with his companions from the tercio under the command of Lope de Figueroa, in the record time of 32 days, in the middle of winter, to go to Flanders at the call of the Duke of Alba. He participated in the battle of Gembloux, in 1578, and in the assault on the city of Zierikzee he carried out one of his legendary feats when, badly wounded, he continued to fight until he got rid of his attackers. It will be these events that Lope de Vega reflects later on in his comedy titled Lo que pasa en una tarde (What happens in an afternoon, 1617), referring to him as "the new Alcides" and "the knight with the bronze fingers", due to his ability to break plates. with just two fingers.

In 1579 he was in Madrid, convalescent, and received some income from Felipe II in recognition of his actions in Flanders. The following year, 1580, he commanded a detachment to participate, under the orders of Sancho Dávila, in the Portuguese campaign. It is the high point of his military career when in 1581 he prevented the attack that a Frenchman planned against Felipe II. In 1582, under the orders of the Marquis of Santa Cruz, he boarded the ships that headed for the Azores participated in the Battle of Vila Franca do Campo.

For this courage and bravery, the king awarded him the Military Order of Calatrava. On May 7, 1582, he had received the Ballesteros de Calatrava Commandery and years later, on January 30, 1595, he would receive the Abanilla Commandery.

In 1587 he was appointed general administrator of Minas del Reino (Kingdom Mines), the management of the 550 mines that were then in Spain and those that were exploited in America. He was able to solve some of the serious mining problems of that time. It is necessary to point out that he managed to carry out this set of inventions from 1598 to the beginning of 1602.

Settled and residing in Murcia, where he would act as alderman for a long time, he was concerned about the safety of the coast, achieving the establishment in Cartagena of part of the fleet established in Barcelona, giving way, since then, to the current naval base. In 1589 gathers a Murcian troop and, together with his brother Francés, who had also gathered Navarrese troops at his expense and charge, go to La Coruña in support of Juan Padilla, captain of the garrison, where a determined María Pita will forge her fame for successfully stopping to Francis Drake and his Counter Armada.

He was also governor of Martos until 1597.

Tomb 
He died from an illness in Madrid, in 1613.

The burial of Jerónimo de Ayanz is supposedly in the Capilla del Socorro, located in the ambulatory of the Murcia Cathedral, a chapel that belonged to the Dávalos, a family with which he had become related after his marriage to Blanca de Pagán Fajardo, and widower of the latter, with his sister Luisa, after being appointed by Felipe II Commander of Abanilla (Order of Calatrava) and then Councilor of Murcia.

After his death in Madrid at the age of 60, he was transferred to the city of Murcia, according to his wishes, resting in the Convent of San Antonio, from which he would later be transferred to the Cathedral, a burial without a headstone attesting to his memory.

Patented invents 
Up to 48 inventions were recognized in 1606 by the «privilegio de invención» (invention privilege) —as patents were then called— signed by Felipe III.

 He built an air-renovated diving suit that allowed a man to remain underwater in the Pisuerga river on 2 August 1602. The diver spent an hour underwater before being ordered to return by King Philip III.
 Also he designed «a submersible load barge and a smaller bathyscaphe, both of them equipped with rows, gloves and portholes to manipulate things, floating snorkels to renovate the air from the inside via pumps, and even commodities, like an inner water-powered fan to cool down the crew.» 
 He patented a steam-powered pump system to drain water and gas out of the mines, after nearly dying in a mining accident in which he almost died in a mine tunnel. This mechanism was successfully tested in Guadalcanal. Half a century ahead of the identical innovations of Edward Somerset or Thomas Savery.

He is best remembered for the invention of the first steam-powered water pump for draining mines, for which he was granted a patent by the Spanish monarchy in 1606.

He also improved scientific equipment, windmills and developed new types of furnaces for industrial, military and household use. He invented a bell-like diving suit and designed a submarine.

See also
 Steam engine
 History of the steam engine

References

Sources
 
 
 

1553 births
1613 deaths
Spanish inventors
Steam engine engineers